Jake Walker may refer to:
Jake Walker (curler) (born 1989), Canadian curler
Jake Austin Walker (born 1997), American singer and actor
Jake Walker (Irish footballer) (born 2000), Irish footballer for St. Patrick's Athletic
Jake Walker (English footballer) (born 2000), English footballer for Newtown
Jake Walker, fictional character from British show Family Affairs